The 2010–11 season was Reading's third season back in the Championship, since relegation from the Premier League in 2008. Having become Reading manager in January 2010, this was Brian McDermott's first full season in charge at the club.

Season review
See also 2010–11 Football League Championship

Pre-season
Summer transfers
Left-back Marcus Williams joined Reading on a free transfer on 11 May 2010, having played seven seasons for Scunthorpe United. Right-back Andy Griffin signed for the club for a nominal fee on 1 July, having made 25 league appearances for Reading, on loan from Stoke City in the 2009–10 season. The transfer deadline day saw the arrival of Zurab Khizanishvili on loan from Blackburn Rovers and Ian Harte from Carlisle United.

Marek Matějovský joined Sparta Prague for a fee of £650,000 on 11 June 2010, having made 56 appearances for the Royals in two-and-a-half years at the club. Kalifa Cissé left the club after three years, signed by former Reading manager Steve Coppell for Bristol City on 9 July 2010. Cissé made 83 appearances for Reading, scoring seven goals. The transfer window also saw the departure of Gylfi Sigurðsson to German Bundesliga club 1899 Hoffenheim for £7 million.

Friendlies

Reading opened their pre-season campaign with a 1–0 victory over Farnborough, Noel Hunt scoring the winning goal.

The Royals then departed on tour to Slovenia, where they enjoyed a 3–1 victory over a Red Star Belgrade B-side, a game in which Marcus Williams made his first appearance for the club. Alex Pearce headed a first-half response for Reading, after Belgrade had taken the lead, and Simon Church sealed the victory with two second-half goals. A third consecutive win followed, as Reading defeated top-flight Croatian side Inter Zaprešić 2–0, with goals from Matt Mills and James Henry. Reading then suffered their first loss of the pre-season campaign, in the final game of the tour, with a 1–0 defeat against NK Celje, striker Gorazd Zajc scored the only goal in the game.

Returning to England, Reading got back to winning ways, coming from behind to beat Wycombe Wanderers 2–1, thanks to goals from Gylfi Sigurðsson, from the penalty spot, and Hal Robson-Kanu. Another 2–1 victory followed in the Royals penultimate pre-season friendly, as another Sigurðsson penalty, and a second half goal from Michail Antonio saw Reading past Wolverhampton Wanderers. Reading's final game of pre-season was a 4–2 victory at Southampton, courtesy of goals from Sigurðsson, Church (2) and Antonio.

August
Reading's league season began in disappointing style with a 2–1 home defeat to Scunthorpe United. After the visitors had taken an early lead through a disputed Garry Thompson goal – the linesman flagging for offside and subsequently overruled by the referee – Gylfi Sigurðsson put Reading on level terms from 25 yards. Despite enjoying spells of pressure, the Royals were unable to find another goal, and Rob Jones headed home a corner to give Scunthorpe the victory.

Reading progressed to the second round of the League Cup with a narrow victory over Torquay United, Grzegorz Rasiak bundling home the winner in the final minute of extra-time. A league draw at Portsmouth followed, the Royals coming from behind to take a point as Jimmy Kébé poked the ball home in the 87th minute following a goal-mouth scramble. The next game Reading went 1–0 up against promotion favourites Nottingham Forest from an Alex Pearce volley, but goalkeeper Adam Federici made a horrible mistake in giving Forest the equaliser by kicking the ball into Jem Karacan which resulted in Robert Earnshaw turning in from close range.

Reading then played League Two opponents Northampton Town in the League Cup in which Reading went 1–0 up courtesy of a Matt Mills backheeler from a Brian Howard corner. Northampton equalised with a horrible mistake from goalkeeper Ben Hamer where he dropped the ball twice in a row to allow Andy Holt a tap-in. Reading went back into the lead with a goal from Hal Robson-Kanu after some saves from the Northampton goalkeeper Oscar Jansson, but again Hamer erred, granting Kevin Thornton the equaliser. In extra time, however, Matt Mills put Reading ahead again only to then score an own goal at the end. Reading subsequently lost 4–2 on penalties, with Simon Church and Jake Taylor having their shots saved. In their next game, Reading won 2–1 over Leicester City with a lob from Gylfi Sigurðsson and a bullet header from Mills. Leicester had equalised with a long range shot from Lloyd Dyer but Reading scored in the 86th minute to hold Leicester at bay for their first win of the season.

September
On 11 September, after the international break and the sale of Sigurðsson, Reading beat Crystal Palace 3–0. The first goal was a penalty won and scored by Shane Long after he cut in from the left and was taken out by Paddy McCarthy. The second was also a penalty after Jem Karacan ran the whole pitch with the ball, to pass to Long who cut in again and was taken out by Julian Bennett. New signing Ian Harte took responsibility and scored. The third was in extra time when Brian Howard lofted a pass to Jimmy Kébé, who then cut in and fired past Julián Speroni. Next, Reading had an away game against in-form Millwall where it ended 0–0 after some brilliant saves by Adam Federici and Millwall goalkeeper David Forde. Reading then lost 3–1 to Middlesbrough after they went 1–0 down in 24 seconds thanks to Scottish midfielder Barry Robson. Next, an ex-Reading player came back to haunt them; Leroy Lita scored to make it 2–0, but a few minutes later, Kébé got one back after he dribbled round two players then passed back to Brian Howard, who laid him off. David Wheater, however, capped it off for Middlesbrough with a header past Adam Federici. Just before the full-time whistle Brian Howard was shown a straight red after a tackle on Andy Halliday.

Next, Reading beat Barnsley 3–0 with three goals in the last 12 minutes. Chris Armstrong made a comeback after 1 seasons out of action with a knee injury. Kébé again put Reading in the lead with a bullet header from substitute Hal Robson-Kanu's cross. Ian Harte then curled a perfect free-kick past Luke Steele to make it 2–0. Robson-Kanu then capped it off with a 50-yard run and then a cool finish under goalkeeper Luke Steele. On the 61st minute, however, Zurab Khizanishvili was sent off after a tackle that never was on Chris Wood. On 28 September, a Tuesday, Reading beat Ipswich Town 1–0 after substitute Simon Church came on and after 30 seconds on, he had the ball in the net. Jem Karacan's shot was steered in well by Church and Matt Mills was sent off for two bookable offences; this marked three Reading red cards in three games.

October
Reading opened October with a trip to Preston North End, earning a 1–1 draw. The Royals went behind in the first-half with a goal from Preston's Keith Treacy, but in the 55th minute, Reading drew level through a sensational 25-yard volley from Jem Karacan. Reading then lost at home to Swansea City by a slim margin, Scott Sinclair giving ex-Reading manager Brendan Rodgers a happy return with his new Swans side. The Tuesday after, Reading again lost, this time to Bristol City with a goal from striker Danny Haynes on 28 minutes. In the next game, Reading beat an "unbeaten-at-home" Burnley 4–0. The first goal came from a Shane Long penalty which he won after being slipped through by Jay Tabb and was fouled by Leon Cort. The next came from Jobi McAnuff after Ian Harte fired in a free-kick and Matt Mills' shot fell to McAnuff to volley in. Soon after, substitute Michail Antonio tapped in Shane Long's cross, while other substitute Simon Church belted in a shot at a tight angle from a Brian Howard pass.

Reading's next match was a 4–3 victory over Doncaster Rovers, coming back from 3–1 down. Matt Mills opened up the scoring early only to have James Hayter equalise. Shelton Martis then put Doncaster in the lead, while two minutes into the second-half, Dean Shiels made it 3–1. Reading brought on Noel Hunt and Simon Church, and Hunt made an immediate impact by crossing in for Jem Karacan to head past Neil Sullivan. Then Harte whipped a superb free-kick into the top corner and to finish off, Church belted in substitute Antonio's squareball.

March
On 8 March 2011, Chris Armstrong announced his retirement from football following being diagnosed with multiple sclerosis. Later on in the day, Reading travelled to Ipswich and won 3–1 thanks to goals from Shane Long, Ian Harte and Noel Hunt, while Connor Wickham scored a consolation goal in injury time at the end of the second half for Ipswich. Reading's next game was a FA Cup quarter-final match against Manchester City at the City of Manchester Stadium. Reading played well before eventually conceding a 74th-minute goal to Micah Richards that turned out to be the only goal of the game, thus eliminating Reading from the FA Cup. Reading where back playing in the Championship on 19 March away at Barnsley; it was a close game, with the winner for the Royals coming in the 71st minute thanks to second-half substitute Mathieu Manset.

April
Reading's Good Friday game against fellow promotion chasers Leeds United ended 0–0 to end a run of eight wins on the trot. On 25 April, a Monday, Reading lost their recent unbeaten record of 13 games in a 3–2 defeat at home to relegation threatened Sheffield United. Reading went 2–0 up inside 20 minutes through Noel Hunt and Hal Robson-Kanu before ex-Royal Darius Henderson pulled one back on 30 minutes and Lee Williamson converted on the stroke of half-time. In the second-half, Henderson scored again to seal the win for the Blades. At Reading's final away game of the season, at Coventry City on Saturday, 30 April, they secured the point they need to secure their place in this season's Championship play-offs with a 0–0 draw.

May

Squad

Left club during season

Transfers

In

Out

Loans in

Loans out

Released

Competitions

Championship

Results summary

Matches

Playoffs

Semi-finals

Final

League table

League Cup

FA Cup

Squad statistics

Appearances and goals

|-
|colspan="14"|Players who appeared for Reading but left during the season:

|}

Top scorers

Disciplinary record

Awards

Player of the season

Player of the Month

Manager of the Month

Team of the Week

Team kit
The 2010–11 Reading F.C. kits.

|
|
|
|}

Notes

References

Reading F.C. seasons
Reading